The AC/DC Club Dates/Rolling Stones Tour was a series of concerts done by the Australian hard rock band AC/DC. The band was a support act for the Rolling Stones' Licks Tour in Germany, but also performed together in Toronto, Canada.

Background
The band performed an exclusive show in New York City at the Roseland Ballroom on 11 March 2003 as part of a contest. Following the exclusive performance, AC/DC joined the Rolling Stones on their tour in Germany as an opening act. As part of the Molson Canadian Rocks for Toronto program for a benefit concert, AC/DC joined to support Rolling Stones on the lineup. The show in Toronto was the largest outdoor ticketed event in Canada, and its gross was in the 9 million range, drawing in 489,176 people. After the benefit concert, AC/DC performed in London, England on 21 October 2003 at the Hammersmith Apollo, which sold out in four minutes.

Setlist

AC/DC with the Rolling Stones
 "Hell Ain't a Bad Place to Be"
 "Back in Black"
 "Dirty Deeds Done Dirt Cheap"
 "Thunderstruck"
 "If You Want Blood (You've Got It)"
 "Hells Bells"
 "Bad Boy Boogie"
 "The Jack"
 "T.N.T."
 "Highway to Hell"
 "Whole Lotta Rosie"
 "You Shook Me All Night Long"
 "Let There Be Rock"
 "Rock 'N Roll Damnation" (omitted on 13 June 2003)
 "For Those About to Rock (We Salute You)" (omitted on 30 July 2003)

Club dates (AC/DC Headline)
 "Hell Ain't a Bad Place to Be"
 "Back in Black"
 "Stiff Upper Lip"
 "Gone Shootin'" (omitted on 17 June 2003, "Shoot to Thrill" played instead)
 "Thunderstruck"
 "Rock 'n' Roll Damnation"
 "What's Next to the Moon"
 "Hard as a Rock"
 "Bad Boy Boogie"
 "The Jack"
 "If You Want Blood (You've Got It)"
 "Hells Bells"
 "Dirty Deeds Done Dirt Cheap"
 "Rock and Roll Ain't Noise Pollution"
 "Shoot to Thrill"
 "T.N.T."
 "Highway to Hell"
 "Whole Lotta Rosie"
 "You Shook Me All Night Long" (omitted on 17 June 2003)
 "Let There Be Rock" (omitted on 11 March 2003)
 "For Those About to Rock (We Salute You)" (omitted on 11 March 2003)

Tour dates

Personnel
Brian Johnson – lead vocals
Angus Young – lead guitar
Malcolm Young – rhythm guitar, backing vocals
Cliff Williams – bass guitar, backing vocals
Phil Rudd – drums

Notes

References

Citations

Sources

AC/DC concert tours
2003 concert tours